Frank William Arundel (20 February 1939 – May 1994) was an English professional footballer.

1939 births
1994 deaths
English footballers
Footballers from Plymouth, Devon
Plymouth Argyle F.C. players
Torquay United F.C. players
English Football League players
Association football midfielders